Lasak may refer to:

Places
Lasak, Gilan, Iran

Other uses
Lasak (surname)